This is a list of best selling singles in Canada  based on sources such as Nielsen Soundscan Canada.

Best-selling singles

References

Canada
Canadian music-related lists
Canadian music industry